The Pyrenees–Mediterranean Euroregion (Euroregió Pirineus Mediterrània; Eurorégion Pyrénées–Méditerannée; Eurorregión Pirineos Mediterráneo; Euroregion Pirenèus-Mediterranèa; EPM; also known as the Pyrenees Mediterranean European Grouping for Territorial Cooperation (EGTC)) is a Euroregion founded on 29 October 2004. It is a political cooperation project between Catalonia, the Balearic Islands, and Occitanie. The Autonomous Community of Aragon suspended participation in 2006 due to an ongoing conflict with Catalonia about some religious art.

Aim 

The aim of the Pyrenees–Mediterranean Euroregion is to create sustainable development within the northwest Mediterranean, to further innovation within these areas, and to contribute to a "socially conscious" Europe, focusing on implementing these factors through innovation, technology and other sources via the European Union's Cohesion Policy.

EPM also focuses on fostering cooperation between cultural and economic networks within the northwest Mediterranean region.

Projects
Projects of the EPM include the allocation of centres of higher education and initiatives for a "Eurocampus" and business creation.

Structure 

Since August 2009, The EPM established a legal entity consisting of a rotating presidency, similar in details to the president of the Euroregion, a general assembly and a technical team.

Offices 

The EPM hosts three offices in Europe including Toulouse, France (Directorate), Barcelona, Spain (General Secretariat) and Brussels, Belgium (Representation to the European Union).

References

Sources 
 Some material from this article is taken from the French Wikipedia article GECT Pyrénées-Mediterranée.

External links 
 REGULATION (EC) No 1082/2006 OF THE EUROPEAN PARLIAMENT AND OF THE COUNCIL of 5 July 2006 on a European grouping of territorial cooperation (EGTC)
 SCADPlus: European Grouping of Territorial Cooperation (EGTC)
 
 Portal Cultura
 UE Committee of Regions Committee of Regions website

Geography of Europe
Euroregions
Balearic Islands
Aragon
Geography of Catalonia
Geography of Occitania (administrative region)